Atari DOS is the disk operating system used with the Atari 8-bit family of computers. Operating system extensions loaded into memory were required in order for an Atari computer to manage files stored on a disk drive. These extensions to the operating system added the disk handler and other file management features.

The most important extension is the disk handler. In Atari DOS 2.0, this was the File Management System (FMS), an implementation of a file system loaded from a floppy disk. This meant at least an additional  RAM was needed to run with DOS loaded.

Versions
There were several versions of Atari DOS available, with the first version released in 1979. Atari was using a cross assembler with Data General AOS.

DOS 1.0
In the first version of DOS from Atari all commands were only accessible from the menu. It was bundled with the 810 disk drives. This version was entirely memory resident, which made it fast but occupied memory space.

DOS 2.0
Also known as DISK OPERATING SYSTEM II VERSION 2.0S
The second, more popular version of DOS from Atari was bundled with the 810 disk drives and some early 1050 disk drives. It is considered to be the lowest common denominator for Atari DOSes, as any Atari-compatible disk drive can read a disk formatted with DOS 2.0S.

DOS 2.0S consisted of DOS.SYS and DUP.SYS. DOS.SYS was loaded into memory, while DUP.SYS contained the disk utilities and was loaded only when the user exited to DOS.

In addition to bug fixes, DOS 2.0S featured improved NOTE/POINT support and the ability to automatically run an Atari executable file named AUTORUN.SYS. Since user memory was erased when DUP.SYS was loaded, an option to create a MEM.SAV file was added. This stored user memory in a temporary file (MEM.SAV) and restored it after DUP.SYS was unloaded. The previous menu option from DOS 1.0, N. DEFINE DEVICE, was replaced with N. CREATE MEM.SAV in DOS 2.0S.

Version 2.0S was for single-density disks, 2.0D was for double-density disks. 2.0D shipped with the 815 Dual Disk Drive, which was both expensive and incompatible with the standard 810, and thus sold only a small number; making DOS version 2.0D rare and unusual.

DOS 3

A new version of DOS that came originally bundled with the 5.25-inch Atari 1050 disk drive. This made use of the new Enhanced Density (ED) capability, also referred to by Atari as Dual Density. This increased storage from 88 KB to 130 KB per disk. There was a single density (88 KB) formatting option to maintain compatibility with older Atari 810 disk drives.

By organizing sectors into blocks, Atari was anticipating larger capacity floppy disks, but this resulted in incompatibility with DOS 2.0S. Files converted to DOS 3 could not be converted back to DOS 2.0. As a result, DOS 3 was extremely unpopular and did not gain widespread acceptance amongst the Atari user community.

DOS 3 provided built-in help via the Atari HELP key and/or the inverse key. Help files needed to be present on the system DOS disk to function properly. DOS 3 also used special XIO commands to control disc operations within BASIC programs.

DOS 2.5
Also known as DISK OPERATING SYSTEM II VERSION 2.5

Version 2.5 is an upgrade to 3.0. After listening to complaints by their customers, Atari released an improved version of their previous DOS. This allowed the use of Enhanced Density disks, and there was a utility to read DOS 3 disks. An additional option was added to the menu (P. FORMAT SINGLE) to format single-density disks. DOS 2.5 was shipped with 1050 disk drives and some early XF551 disk-drives.

Included utilities were DISKFIX.COM, COPY32.COM, SETUP.COM and RAMDISK.COM.

DOS 4.0
Codename during production: QDOS
DOS 4.0 was designed for the never-released 1450XLD. The rights were returned to the author, Michael Barall, who placed it in the public domain. It was later published by Antic Software. DOS 4.0 used blocks instead of single sectors, and supported single, enhanced, and double density, as well as both single- and double-sided drives. DOS 4.0 was not compatible with DOS 2 or 3 disks but could read files from them. It also did not automatically switch densities, and it was necessary to go to the menu and manually select the correct density.

DOS XE
Codename during production: ADOS
DOS XE supported the double-density and double-sided capabilities of the Atari XF551 drive, as well as its burst I/O. DOS XE used a new disk format which was incompatible with DOS 2.0S and DOS 2.5, requiring a separate utility for reading older 2.0 files. It also required bank-switched RAM, so it did not run on the 400/800 machines. It supported date-stamping of files and sub-directories.

DOS XE was the last DOS made by Atari for the Atari 8-bit family.

Third-party DOS programs
Many of these DOSes were released by manufacturers of third-party drives, anyone who made drive modifications, or anyone who was dissatisfied with the available DOSes. Often, these DOSes could read disks in higher densities, and could set the drive to read disks faster (using Warp Speed or Ultra-Speed techniques). Most of these DOSes (except SpartaDOS) were DOS 2.0 compatible.

SmartDOS
Menu driven DOS that was compatible with DOS 2.0. Among the first third-party DOS programs to support double-density drives.

Many enhancements including sector copying and verifying, speed checking, turning on/off file verifying and drive reconfiguration.

Published by Rana Systems. Written by John Chenoweth and Ron Bieber, last version 8.2D.

OS/A+ and DOS XL
DOS produced by Optimized Systems Software. Compatible with DOS 2.0 - Allowed the use of Double Density floppies. Unlike most ATARI DOSses, this used a command line instead of a menu. DOS XL provided a menu program in addition to the command line.

SuperDOS
This DOS could read SS/SD, SS/ED, SS/DD and DS/DD disks, and made use of all known methods of speeding up disk-reads supported by the various third-party drive manufacturers.

Published by Technical Support. Written by Paul Nicholls.

Top-DOS
Menu driven DOS with enhanced features. Sorts disk directory listings and can set display options. File directory can be compressed. Can display deleted files and undelete them. Some advanced features required a proprietary TOP-DOS format.

Published by Eclipse Software. Written by R. K. Bennett.

Turbo-DOS
This DOS supports Turbo 1050, Happy, Speedy, XF551 and US Doubler highspeed drives. XL/XE only.

Published by Martin Reitershan Computertechnik. Written by Herbert Barth and Frank Bruchhäuser.

MyDOS
This DOS adds the ability to use sub-directories, and supports hard-drives.

Published by Wordmark Systems, includes complete source code.

SpartaDOS
This DOS used a command-line interface. Was not compatible with DOS 2.0, but could read DOS 2.0 disks. Supports subdirectories and hard drives being capable of handling filesystems sized up to 16 MB. Included the capability to create primitive batch files.

SpartaDOS X

A more sophisticated version of SpartaDOS, which strongly resembles MS-DOS in its look and feel. It was shipped on a 64 KB ROM cartridge.

RealDOS
A SpartaDOS compatible DOS (in fact, a renamed version of SpartaDOS 3.x, due to legal reasons).

RealDOS is Shareware by Stephen J. Carden and Ken Ames.

BW-DOS

A SpartaDOS compatible DOS, the last version 1.30 was released in December 1995. It has a much lower memory footprint compared to the original SpartaDOS and does not use the RAM under the ROM of XL/XE machines, allowing it to be used on the older Atari 400/800 models.

BW-DOS is Freeware by Jiří Bernasek.

XDOS
XDOS is Freeware by Stefan Dorndorf.

Disk formats
A number of different formats existed for Atari disks. Atari DOS 2.0S, single-sided, single-density disk had 720 sectors divided into 40 tracks. After formatting, 707 sectors were free. Each 128-byte sector used the last 3 bytes for housekeeping data (bytes used, file number, next sector), leaving 125 bytes for data. This meant each disk held 707 × 125 = 88,375 bytes of user data.

The single-density disk holding a mere 88 KB per side remained the most popular Atari 8-bit disk format throughout the series' lifetime, and almost all commercial software continued to be sold in that format (or variants of it modified for copy protection), since it was compatible with all Atari-made disk drives.

 Single-Sided, Single-Density: 40 tracks with 18 sectors per track, 128 bytes per sector. 90 KB capacity.
 Single-Sided, Enhanced-Density: 40 tracks with 26 sectors per track, 128 bytes per sector. 130 KB capacity. Readable by the 1050 and the XF551.
 Single-Sided, Double-Density: 40 tracks with 18 sectors per track, 256 bytes per sector. 180 KB capacity. Readable by the XF551, the 815, or modified/upgraded 1050.
 Double-Sided, Double-Density: 80 tracks (40 tracks per side) with 18 sectors per track, 256 bytes per sector. 360 KB capacity. Readable by the XF551 only.

Percom standard
In 1978, Percom established a double-density layout standard which all other manufacturers of Atari-compatible disk drives such as Indus, Amdek, and Rana —except Atari itself— followed. A configuration block of 12 bytes defines the disk layout.

References

Notes

  (Online version)
Mapping the Atari, Revised Edition by Ian Chadwick

External links
Atari DOS Reference Manual — Reference manual for DOS 3.
Antic Vol.4 No.3 Everything You Wanted To Know About Every DOS
Atari Dos 4 (aka ANTIC Dos aka QDOS) Documentation on Atari DOS 4
MyDOS Source Code from Wordmark Systems.

Atari 8-bit family software
Atari operating systems
Disk operating systems
Discontinued operating systems
1979 software